These are the official results of the Men's Long Jump event at the 1991 IAAF World Championships in Tokyo, Japan. There were a total number of 43 participating athletes, with two qualifying groups and the final held on Friday August 30, 1991.

Medalists

Analysis
This was perhaps the greatest long jump competition ever, as both of the top two athletes achieved distances beyond the then world record which had stood for almost 23 years (though one was over the wind-legal limit of 2.0 m/s).  Both made the best wind-legal jumps of their careers in this competition; the still best and still third best wind-legal jumps in history; and the best two long jumps not aided by altitude.

Carl Lewis' record at the time was: two-time Olympic gold medalist, two-time world champion (in the era when it was also still a once-every-four-year event) and, having been undefeated in ten years, he was deservedly considered the best long jumper in the world.  Lewis had set the world record in the 100 metres sprint five days earlier.  Lewis was in the lead through four rounds: his first round jump of 8.68 set a new championship record, then his third round jump set his then personal record, albeit wind assisted at 8.83w.

Mike Powell's fourth round jump looked like it was in the range of Lewis, but was ruled a foul. The closeness of the call upset Powell: he went down to his knees at the board trying to see the microscopic indentation into the plasticine indicating it was a foul. Lewis' fourth round jump was wind-aided, but, at 8.91w m, it was the longest ever competition long jump in history, beating the existing wind-legal world record set by Bob Beamon at altitude at the 1968 Summer Olympics. But the competition was not over. Both athletes still had one jump remaining.

Thus the competition included three of the five best wind-legal long-jumps ever; two of them by Carl Lewis, plus a wind-aided jump by Lewis beyond the then world record (a record he had been chasing for ten years), yet Lewis still finished in second place.  Since this competition, no athlete, including Powell and Lewis, has 'legally' jumped within 20 cm of Powell's world record (though some had in the previous decade or so).
-

Coverage
This momentous event achieved another unique occurrence.  It was the only time American network television, in this case NBC, devoted over 20 minutes to a single field event competition. See the video in four parts, primarily narrated by Dwight Stones:  Part 1 the introduction, Part 2, 
Part 3, Part 4.

Schedule
All times are Japan Standard Time (UTC+9)

Records
Prior to this competition, the existing world and Championship records were as follows.

Qualifying round
Held on Thursday 1991-08-29

Final

See also
 1988 Men's Olympic Long Jump (Seoul)
 1990 Men's European Championships Long Jump
 1991 Long Jump Year Ranking
 1992 Men's Olympic Long Jump
 1993 Men's World Championships Long Jump

References

 Official Results (Archived 2009-06-10) iaaf.org

L
Long jump at the World Athletics Championships